Chakdaha College, established in 1973, is a college in Chakdaha, in Nadia district, West Bengal, India. It offers undergraduate courses in arts, commerce and sciences. It is affiliated to  University of Kalyani.

Courses Offered
The college is recognized by the University Grants Commission (UGC).

See also

References

External links
Chakdaha College
University of Kalyani
University Grants Commission
National Assessment and Accreditation Council

Colleges affiliated to University of Kalyani
Educational institutions established in 1973
Universities and colleges in Nadia district
1973 establishments in West Bengal